Vieste Lighthouse, also Isola Santa Eufemia is an active lighthouse on the islet of Santa Eufemia, located between the rocks of Santa Croce and San Francesco, just opposite the town of Vieste, Apulia, Italy. Its position is strategic for the shipping lanes in the middle and lower Adriatic Sea.

Description
The lighthouse was built on plan by Francesco Saverio Gatta in 1867 in limestone; it has an octagonal prism form with balcony and lantern and it is placed atop a two-story building. The lighthouse is completely controlled and operated by the Command Area Lighthouses Navy based in Venice. The Marina Militare has been responsible for managing  of all the lights along Italy's 8000 kilometre  coastline Italian since 1910, using both military and civilian technicians.

The lighthouse receives its electricity by an overhead powerline from the Italian mainland. East of the lighthouse, is a free-standling lattice tower insulated against ground used for a DGPS-transmitter working on 292.5 kHz.

See also
 List of lighthouses in Italy

References

External links

 Servizio Fari Marina Militare 

Lighthouses completed in 1867
Lighthouses in Italy
Buildings and structures in the Province of Foggia
Vieste